Westport Light State Park is a public recreation area of  on the Pacific Ocean in Grays Harbor County, Washington. It sits adjacent to the historic Grays Harbor Light, the tallest lighthouse in Washington. The park was combined with the former Westhaven State Park and an additional  parcel that had been under development as a golf course in 2016. Park activities include hiking, fishing, beachcombing, and birdwatching.

References

External links 
Westport Light State Park Washington State Parks and Recreation Commission 
Westhaven and Westport Light State Parks Map Washington State Parks and Recreation Commission

State parks of Washington (state)
Parks in Grays Harbor County, Washington